The Kusel Autumn Fair, one of the biggest folk festivals in the Palatinate region of Germany, takes place annually on the first weekend in September in the county town of Kusel.

Description 
It was first held in 1924 and generally lasts five days. It is officially started on Fridays with an opening ceremony by the Bürgermeister and the enthroning of the Kuseline. The fair always closes with a firework display on Tuesday.

In addition to various amusement rides and a festival tent, there are also many stalls along Trier Street where various consumer goods are offered. Information on the numbers of visitors is not yet available.

Kuseline 
Every year on Friday, the newly elected Kuseline is presented, a woman chosen annually by a jury of local dignitaries, comparable to a wine queen. The election of the first Kuseline in 1977 was initiated by Paul Kaps, the former deputy editor-in-chief of the daily newspaper, Die Rheinpfalz, and the then leader of the Rhenish-Palatinate local editorial office in Kusel, Wolfdietrich Meder.

Election 
The election is held annually two weeks before the Kusel Autumn Fair in the tithe barn at Lichtenberg Castle. There, the candidates stand individually in front of a jury and talk about their profession, hobbies and motivation to apply for the office of Kuseline.
The jury is composed of the one representative from each of the following: Kusel county, the collective municipality of Kusel, the town of Kusel, the Kreissparkasse bank, the Kusel interest group, the retail association, the tourist office, the Karlsberg brewery, the Simon drinks company, the aviation club, Voborsky Intercoiffure and two representatives from the local newsroom. The Kuseline who is still in office, not only sits on the jury, but also announces her successor's name after the election.

Inauguration 
The accession of the new Kuseline traditionally takes place on the first evening of the autumn fair. She is introduced into office by a leading editor of the daily newspaper Die Rheinpfalz. Since 2007, the former Kuselinen have met in the Deutsches Haus restaurant. Afterwards they go to the exhibition tent together to participate in the enthronement. 

During her one year in office, the Kuseline receives numerous gifts from the sponsors participating in the election. This includes a sightseeing flight over the county of Kusel, a trip to the twin town of Toucy, free hairstyles at Intercoiffure Voborsky and much more. The current Kuseline has numerous engagements in and around the county of Kusel. The first date after the enthronement is the procession on Saturday at the Kusel Autumn Fair. On the occasion of the 30th anniversary of the Kuseline, a number of former Kuselines took part in the parade of the Kusel Autumn Fair.

Office holders 
 1977/1978: Ruth Hinkelmann
 1978/1979: Petra Herrmann
 1979/1980: Jutta Baehr
 1980/1981: Sabine Fischer
 1981/1982: Karin Pfeffer
 1982/1983: Gisela Bell
 1983/1984: Doris Hektor
 1984/1985: Gabi Matzenbacher
 1985/1986: Uschi Hoffmann
 1986/1987: Sabine Ganter
 1987/1988: Tatjana Kuhne
 1988/1989: Stefanie Gilcher
 1989/1990: Sonja Pohl
 1990/1991: Anke Matz
 1991/1992: Anika Scheuermann
 1992/1993: Michaela Müller
 1993/1994: Nicole Niebergall
 1994/1995: Janine Wild
 1995/1996: Kerstin Steinhauer
 1996/1997: Martina Weber
 1997/1998: Nadine Klein
 1998/1999: Julia Oberfrank
 1999/2000: Jasmin Immesberger
 2000/2001: Jessica Heidrich
 2001/2002: Michaela Rech
 2002/2003: Katja Ranker
 2003/2004: Annika Kreckmann
 2004/2005: Jennifer Albl
 2005/2006: Sarah Schnitzer
 2006/2007: Lena Daniel
 2007/2008: Insa Emrich
 2008/2009: Sabrina Pannes
 2009/2010: Rose Kreuzahler
 2010/2011: Ines Schmidt
 2011/2012: Verena Letzel
 2012/2013: Hannah Decker
 2013/2014: Nadine Sooss
 2014/2015: Julia Reiser
 2015/2016: Jessica Ulrich
 2016/2017: Milena Keiper

External links 
 Kuseler Herbstmesse

German traditions
Kusel (district)
Culture of the Palatinate (region)